Norwood is a residential locality in the local government area (LGA) of Launceston in the Launceston LGA region of Tasmania. The 2016 census recorded a population of 3734 for the state suburb of Norwood.
It is a suburb southeast of the Launceston CBD. The minor suburb of Queechy is also included as part of Norwood. The area was opened up for development in the 1960s with considerable growth in the 1970s to 1980s and contains a mix of large, older-style family homes with patches of more modern homes, mostly in the central-eastern portion of the suburb. Norwood is located on a 60-80m high, relatively flat-topped alluvial plateau with the valley of the North Esk River to the east, the Punchbowl Reserve to the north and the Carr Villa Flora Reserve, Carr Villa Cemetery and the Kings Meadows Golf Course to the west.

History 
Norwood was gazetted as a locality in 1963.

Geography
The North Esk River forms most of the eastern to northern boundaries.

Road infrastructure 
Route C403 (Quarantine Road / Johnston Road) runs through from west to east.

Facilities
IGA supermarket
Primary school
High school
Aged care facility

Education
Norwood has two public schools, Norwood Primary for years 1-6 and Queechy High for years 7-10

References

Suburbs of Launceston, Tasmania
Localities of City of Launceston